Huen may refer to:

People
 Huen Su Yin (born 1985), Malaysian blogger and cake designer
 Marianela Huen (born 1960), Venezuelan swimmer
 Victor Huen (1874–1939), French illustrator

Places
 Entebbe International Airport, Uganda (by ICAO code)